Torbido Lake is a lake in the Province of Modena, Emilia-Romagna, Italy.

Lakes of Emilia-Romagna